Minett is a surname. Notable people with the surname include:

 Henry Minett (1857–1952), American naval officer
 Jason Minett (born 1971), English footballer
 Louise Minett (born 1975), British sports shooter

See also
 Minett Islet
 Minott